Äxmät Bikçäntäyef (1911 – 1985) was an architect.

Biography 
Äxmät Bikçäntäyef was born in 1911 in the village of Olı Mäñgär. In 1931–1938 he received professional education in Qazan and Leningrad institutes of municipal construction engineers; after the completion of studies he worked in the architectural and planning workshop under the Qazan City Executive Committee. Between 1939 and 1945, Bikçäntäyef served in the Red Army and participated in Soviet occupation of Bessarabia and Northern Bukovina and German–Soviet War. Since 1947 he worked at Kazan Institute of Civil Engineering, receiving a titile of professor in 1981; at the same time Bikçäntäyef was a chairman of the Union of Architects of the Tatar ASSR (1967–1970).

Works 
 The building of the Kazan Institute of Civil Engineering (1947)
 The building of Qazan State University's chemical faculty (1953)
 administrative center of the village of Şäpşe TASSR's Biektaw district
 several Stalin style residential houses in Qazan.

Awards 
 Honored Artist of the Tatar ASSR (1969) 
 Laureate of the USSR Council of Ministers Award (1973)
 Honored Architect of the RSFSR (1980)

References

External links 

1911 births
1985 deaths
Soviet architects